Wind Up Dancer is a 2019 Burmese romantic-drama film, directed by Myo Myint Swe starring Daung, Yan Aung, Zin Wine, Aung Lay, Leo, Angel Lamung and Alice Ong. The film, produced by Jataka Film Production premiered in Myanmar on May 9, 2019.

Cast
Daung as Thurain
Angel Lamung as Thet Tant May
Aung Lay as Sue
Alice Ong as Cinthia
Leo as Leo
Yan Aung
Zin Wine

References

2019 films
2010s Burmese-language films
Burmese romantic drama films
Films shot in Myanmar
2019 romantic drama films